Yuanshan Township is a rural township in the western part of Yilan County, Taiwan.

Geography
 Area: 
 Population: 31,893 (February 2023)

Administrative divisions
The township comprises 16 villages:
 Hubei (湖北村), Huihao (惠好村), Hudong/Hutung (湖東村), Huxi (湖西村), Neicheng (內城村), Qixian (七賢村), Shangde (尚德村), Shengou (深溝村), Tongle (同樂村), Toufen (頭分村), Yixian (逸仙村), Yonghe (永和村), Yuanshan (員山村), Zhenshan (枕山村), Zhenxiang (蓁巷村) and Zhonghua (中華村).

Tourist attractions
 Fushan Botanical Garden
 Jim and Dad's Brewery
 Kavalan Distillery
 Yuanshan Park

Transportation
The nearest train station to the township is Yilan Station of the Taiwan Railway Administration, located in Yilan City.
Highway
Provincial Highway 7:Northern Cross-Country Highway
Prov 7d
Bus
List of bus routes in Yilan
Kamalan Bus Inc.
751 Yilan Transfer Station - Baomin Temple
752 Yilan Transfer Station - Taipei Veterans General Hospital Yuanshan Branch
753 Yilan Transfer Station - Shuanglian Pond
755 Yilan Transfer Station - Wanglongpo
Kuo-Kuang Motor Transportation
G12 Yilan Transfer Station - Songluo
G15 Yilan Transfer Station - Da Jiao Xi
1785 Yilan Transfer Station - Waiyuanshan - Zuntou
1786 Yilan Transfer Station - Shengou - Neicheng
1789 Yilan Transfer Station - Zhensha - Dajiaoxi

Notable natives
 Yang Li-hua, opera performer
 Lin Yun-ju, table tennis player

References

External links

  
 Yuanshan Veterans Hospital

Townships in Yilan County, Taiwan